Justice Asoka S. Wijetunga was a Sri Lankan judge. He was a Judge of the Supreme Court of Sri Lanka and Magistrate.

Wijetunga was educated at Royal College Colombo.

References

Puisne Justices of the Supreme Court of Sri Lanka
Sinhalese judges
Alumni of Royal College, Colombo